Viktor Lomidze, also known by his Polish name of Wiktor Łomidze-Wachtang, was a Georgian-Polish military officer. After the Bolshevik take-over of his country in early 1920s he emigrated to Poland, where he joined the Polish Army and then the Polish Navy.

Between 1935 and 1939 he was the commanding officer (in the rank of Captain) of ORP Jaskółka, a Polish minesweeper and minelayer. Later on he became the deputy commander of the ORP Gryf.

At the outbreak of the Polish Defensive War of 1939, on September 1, with other Polish warships, Gryf left the naval base at Gdynia for the Operation Rurka, a failed attempt to lay a minefield at the entrances to the Gdańsk Bay. After boarding naval mines from a floating depot, the flotilla headed for Hel Peninsula, assisted by ORP Wicher and several smaller vessels (among them Łomidze's former ship Jaskółka). En route she was attacked by a squadron of 33 German Ju 87B dive bombers and hit with several bombs. Although the damages were minor, the ship lost 22 sailors, including its captain Lt.Cmdr. Stefan Kwiatkowski in what became known as the battle of the Gdańsk Bay. Kwiatkowski's deputy, Capt. Wiktor Łomidze decided to throw all defused naval mines in the waters for fear of explosion and headed for Hel naval base. There it was decided to use the ship as a floating anti-air artillery battery guarding the harbour.

During the final days of the Polish defence of Pomerania, Łomidze, along with several other naval officers, crossed the Baltic on a small fishing cutter. They reached the port of Liepāja, from where Łomidze got to Sweden and then to the United Kingdom.

There he applied to the Polish Navy being reconstructed there by the Polish Government in Exile. Although he was admitted, he was also held responsible for the decision to throw away the mines back in September 1939, a decision that successfully crippled the Polish defensive operations in the Baltic Sea. Because of that, and despite Łomidze's pleas, he was never again given a command over any Polish vessel. Instead he spent the remainder of World War II at various staff duties. He finished his career in the rank of Commander.

References

Polish Army officers
Military personnel from Georgia (country)
People of World War II from Georgia (country)
Georgian emigrants to Poland
Polish Navy officers